Kristýna Plíšková was the defending champion, but chose to participate in Trnava instead. Remarkably, all of the eight seeded players lost in the first round.

Ksenia Lykina won the title, defeating Kyōka Okamura in the final, 6–2, 6–7(2–7), 6–0.

Seeds

Main draw

Finals

Top half

Bottom half

References 
 Main draw

Fukuoka International Women's Cup - Singles
Fukuoka International Women's Cup